Macaria or Makaria is the name of two figures from ancient Greek religion and mythology. Although they are not said to be the same and are given different fathers, they are discussed together in a single entry both in the 10th-century Byzantine encyclopedia the Suda and by Zenobius.

Daughter of Heracles 
In the Heracleidae of Euripides, Macaria ("she who is blessed") is a daughter of Heracles. Even after Heracles' death, King Eurystheus pursues his lifelong vendetta against the hero by hunting down his children. Macaria flees with her siblings and her father's old friend Iolaus to Athens, where they are received by Demophon, the king.

Arriving at the gates of Athens with his army, Eurystheus gives Demophon an ultimatum, threatening war upon Athens unless Demophon surrenders Heracles's children. When Demophon refuses and begins to prepare for war, an oracle informs him that Athens will be victorious only if a noble maiden is sacrificed to Persephone. Upon hearing this, Macaria sees that her only choice is immediate death on the altar or eventual death at the hands of Eurystheus. Since in neither case will she be granted a normal, happy life, she offers herself as the victim to save the welcoming city and its inhabitants, declining a lottery that would put other girls at risk. The Athenians honored her with lavish funeral rites, and the myth has an aetiological aspect: the spring where she died was named the Macarian in her honor.

Daughter of Hades 
A character Macaria ('', literally 'blessed') is named in the Byzantine encyclopedia Suda. According to the Suda, this Macaria is the daughter of Hades (no mother is mentioned). Although not explicitly stated to be an immortal goddess, she seems to have been connected to blessed death; the Suda connects her name to the figure of speech "be gone to blessedness," instead of misery or damnation, which may be euphemistic, in the way that the dead are referred to as "the blessed ones." The phrase was proverbial for those whose courage endangered them.

See also 

 Melinoë
 Menoeceus
 Iphigenia

References

External links 

 Makaria at The Theoi Project
 English translation of Euripides' Heracleidae

Heracleidae
Greek goddesses
Underworld goddesses
Children of Heracles
Chthonic beings